E74 may refer to:
 European route E74
 King's Indian Defence, Encyclopaedia of Chess Openings code
 Hiroshima Expressway and Hamada Expressway, route E74 in Japan

See also

Xbox 360 technical problems#E74 error